is a 1956 black-and-white Japanese film directed by Koji Shima.

Cast 
 Kazuo Hasegawa
 Chikage Awashima
 Tamao Nakamura
 Mitsuko Yoshikawa

See also 
 The Story of the Last Chrysanthemum (残菊物語 Zangiku monogatari) (1939) by Kenji Mizoguchi

References

External links 
 
  http://search.varietyjapan.com/moviedb/cinema_24799.html
  http://www.allcinema.net/prog/show_c.php?num_c=137212

Japanese black-and-white films
1956 films
Films directed by Koji Shima
Daiei Film films
Films produced by Masaichi Nagata
1950s Japanese films
Japanese romantic drama films
1950s romantic drama films

ja:残菊物語#1956年版